George Hutchison (1846 – 30 July 1930) was a New Zealand politician from Taranaki.

Early life

Hutchison was born in Dundee, Scotland, in 1846. He was a son of William Hutchison, later a Wellington Mayor and Member of Parliament. Hutchison Jr received his education in Ireland and Scotland until age 15. He came to New Zealand with his parents in 1866. His father, a journalist, had been hired by The Southern Cross newspaper in Auckland.

Hutchison Jr studied law and from 1872, he practised in Wanganui and then Wellington. He married Agnes Hogg, the daughter of Rev. David Hogg, on 31 March 1874 at Wanganui.

Political career

His first attempt at entering the New Zealand House of Representatives was in April 1875, when he stood in the Rangitikei by-election. He performed poorly and of the three candidates, he came last with 11% of the vote.

He was an independent conservative MP, and a lawyer. He contested the 1893 election against William Cowern. For six years (from 1890 to 1896) George and his father were in Parliament at the same time, and were often seen glaring at each other from opposite sides of the house.

When parliament opened in 1901, there were questions asked of the Speaker as to when he actually resigned, and it was intimated that he had actually resigned eight or nine months earlier.

Later life
Hutchison went to South Africa during 1899 as a legal adviser for Lord Roberts during the Second Boer War. He returned to South Africa in 1901 and practised law for a few years. He came back to Taranaki in January 1906 and by 1908 had resumed his law practice in Wanganui. He then spent two years in England before he returned to Auckland, where he lived for the remaining years of his life. He died on 30 July 1930 at the Auckland suburb of Saint Heliers.

References

1846 births
1930 deaths
Members of the New Zealand House of Representatives
19th-century New Zealand lawyers
New Zealand MPs for North Island electorates
New Zealand military personnel of the Second Boer War
Unsuccessful candidates in the 1881 New Zealand general election
Unsuccessful candidates in the 1884 New Zealand general election
Unsuccessful candidates in the 1908 New Zealand general election
People from Dundee
Scottish emigrants to New Zealand
Politicians from Dundee
19th-century New Zealand politicians
20th-century New Zealand lawyers